Mark McCorkle (born August 1961) is an American screenwriter, television writer and television producer. Among others, he is co-creator of the popular Disney animated series, Kim Possible. He frequently collaborates with fellow writer Bob Schooley. Prior to Kim Possible, McCorkle, Schooley, and the main director of Kim Possible, Steve Loter, also held their respective jobs (writer/producer and director respectively) on Buzz Lightyear of Star Command. Many voice talents on Kim Possible, also did work on Buzz Lightyear of Star Command (Nicole Sullivan, Patrick Warburton). He worked on DreamWorks' The Penguins of Madagascar as a producer along with Schooley, again with regular voices Sullivan and John DiMaggio. From 2017 to 2021, McCorkle and Schooley created and executive produced a TV series based on the 2014 Disney animated feature, Big Hero 6 for Disney XD and Disney Channel.

He has also written screenplays for Aladdin: The Return of Jafar, Aladdin and the King of Thieves, The Lion King II: Simba's Pride, Sky High and Hotel for Dogs as well as co-writer again with Bob Schooley of the novel Liar of Kudzu.

Filmography
Maxie's World - sound department (1987)
The Real Ghostbusters - producer, sound department (1988-1990)
ALF Tales - sound department (1988)
ALF (TV series) - sound department (1988-1989)
C.O.P.S. - producer, sound department (1988-1989)
The New Adventures of Beany and Cecil - sound department (1988)
G.I. Joe: Operation Dragonfire (1989)
Ring Raiders - casting director (1989)
Captain N: The Game Master - sound department (1989)
Teenage Mutant Ninja Turtles - producer (1989)
The Karate Kid (TV series) - sound department (1989)
Camp Candy - sound department (1989)
New Kids on the Block - producer, (1989)
The Super Mario Bros. Super Show! - sound department (1989)
Little Golden Book Land - sound department (1989)
Captain Planet and the Planeteers - producer, sound department (1990-1991)
Swamp Thing (1991)
Goof Troop - producer (1992)
Bonkers (1993)
The Return of Jafar - screenwriter (1994)
Aladdin: The Series - story editor (1994)
Aladdin and the King of Thieves - screenwriter (1996)
Great Minds Think 4 Themselves - writer (1997)
The Lion King 2: Simba's Pride - screenwriter (1998)
Disney's Hercules - writer, producer (1998-1999)
Buzz Lightyear of Star Command: The Adventure Begins - screenwriter, producer (2000)
Buzz Lightyear of Star Command - writer, producer (2000-2001)
Kim Possible - co-creator, executive producer, writer, lyrics (1 episode) (2002-2007)
Kim Possible: A Sitch in Time - executive producer (2003)
Kim Possible Movie: So the Drama - screenwriter, executive producer, story editor (2005)
Sky High - screenwriter (2005)
Jasmine's Enchanted Tales: Journey of a Princess (2005)
Enchanted - uncredited rewrite (2007)
Hotel for Dogs - screenwriter (2009)
The Penguins of Madagascar - writer, executive producer (2009-2015)
Monsters vs. Aliens - writer, executive producer (2013-2014)
Tinker Bell and the Legend of the NeverBeast - screenwriter (2014)
All Hail King Julien - executive consultant: season 1 (2014)
Big Hero 6: The Series - co-developer, executive producer (2017–2021)
Kim Possible - screenwriter, executive producer, based on TV series (2019)

External links 

https://twitter.com/ridiculousmark

American male screenwriters
American television producers
American television writers
Living people
Place of birth missing (living people)
1961 births
American male television writers
Nickelodeon Animation Studio people
Disney Television Animation people
DreamWorks Animation people
American casting directors
Primetime Emmy Award winners